Thomas William Spink (13 November 1887 – 1966) was an English professional footballer who played as a right winger for Grimsby Town, Hibernian and Fulham. Tommy Spink had a younger brother, James "Jimmy" Spink, who played for Newcastle United before the outbreak of World War One.

Playing career 
Thomas William Spink was born in Dipton, County Durham and was a professional footballer who primarily played for Grimsby Town. In 1919, he was measured at 5ft 7 inch, and weighed 11 stone. His favoured position was outside right (right winger). In a "A Who's Who of Grimsby Town AFC 1890-1985" by Douglas Lamming, the book states his playing career began at Craghead United (two seasons) and that: "Notably fast - he had won many prizes on the running track - and among the most prominent Mariners of his day. Not a robust performer yet Tommy was reckoned Town's best right-winger for 30 years because of his speed, pinpoint centering and consistency. Was still turning out for Worksop as late as 1926/7." During the First World War he made appearances as a 'War Guest' for various clubs, and played alongside his brother Jimmy for Grimsby Town during the 1916/17 season. He also played professionally for Hibernian, Fulham, Rochdale, and Worksop Town.

Grimsby Town A.F.C. Side (Pre-War): 1914/1915 
The Mariner 'Official Matchday Magazine' printed a picture of the side, and a brief biography of the side's players and their service during the war. The magazine article mentioned the following players:

Sid Wheelhouse: Club captain who died of his wounds at Beaumont Hamel, September 1916.

Ralph Thompson: Winger, lost his life on the first day of the Battle of the Somme, July 1916.

Dave Kenny: Centre half, served in the Middlesex Regiment's footballers battalion, survived the war.

Frank Martin: Left half, served in the Middlesex Regiment's footballers battalion, survived the war.

Tom Rippon: Forward, worked in the mines, before joining the army.

George Rampton: Forward, did 'war work' in the midlands.

Percy Summers: Goalkeeper, joined the footballers battalion, injuries from a grenade ensured he would play only one game after the war.

Tommy Spink: Served firstly in a munitions factory, then with the Durham Light Infantry, survived the war.

Playing record

Match reports 
Due to the era that Tommy Spink played in, there is a lack of media coverage of his career. However, Playupliverpool have listed a clipping of a match report from 28 April – 1914. The game was Rochdale vs Liverpool, and the result was a 2–2 draw. The match report states: "On their respective wings Spink and Smith were at times sparklingly clever; especially so was Spink, for his runs and centres were quite a feature of the second half."

Later life 
He died in 1966 and was buried with his family in Cleethorpes.

References 

1887 births
1966 deaths
People from Dipton, County Durham
Footballers from County Durham
English footballers
Association football wingers
Grimsby Town F.C. players
Hartlepool United F.C. wartime guest players
Durham Light Infantry soldiers
British Army personnel of World War I
Military personnel from County Durham